CANZUK is a proposed alliance comprising Canada, Australia, New Zealand and the United Kingdom as part of an international organisation or confederation similar in scope to the former European Economic Community. This includes increased trade, foreign policy co-operation, military co-operation and mobility of citizens between the four states, tied together by similar economic systems, social values and political and legal systems, in addition to the majority population of each country speaking English. The idea is lobbied by the advocacy group CANZUK International and supported primarily by conservatives. Other supporters include think tanks such as the Adam Smith Institute, the Henry Jackson Society, Bruges Group and politicians from the four countries.

History

The term
The term CANZUK was first coined by William David McIntyre in his 1967 book Colonies into Commonwealth in the context of a "CANZUK Union". The idea of increased migration, trade and foreign policy cooperation between the CANZUK countries was created and popularized in 2015 by CEO and Founder of CANZUK International (formerly the Commonwealth Freedom of Movement Organisation), James Skinner.

In the wake of the 2016 United Kingdom European Union membership referendum and the decision made by the United Kingdom to leave the European Union, writers such as Andrew Lilico and James C. Bennett, along with academics such as the historian Andrew Roberts, also advocated that Canada, Australia, New Zealand and the United Kingdom merge and form a new entity in international politics. Andrew Roberts suggested that such a bloc could slot into the international order as a third pillar of the West (alongside the United States and the European Union). Beyond this, Roberts argues that due to its territorial scale, geographic scope and advanced economy that it would qualify as a "great power" and potentially a "global power" (or emerging superpower).

Some advocates such as Roberts favour a federal or confederal union. Others, such as Lilico, describe the objective as being the creation of a "geopolitical partnership" akin to the European Economic Community. In the version favoured by Lilico, by the advocacy group CANZUK international and by the Conservative Party of Canada, the proposal would involve the creation of a free-movement zone, a multilateral free trade agreement and a security partnership. The more general concept of deepening trade ties (with or without a multilateral agreement) has many advocates, including figures such as former Australian Prime Minister Scott Morrison, Canadian Prime Minister Justin Trudeau, former British Prime Minister Theresa May and former New Zealand Prime Minister Jacinda Ardern.

Relationship

Canada, Australia and New Zealand are former settler colonies of the British Empire where people of British ethnic origin came to constitute the majority of the population. Today, the four CANZUK countries maintain a close affinity of cultural, diplomatic and military ties to one another. The Australian and New Zealand flags contain the flag of the United Kingdom in their canton; and the Union Flag is also one of two official flags of Canada (referred to as the Royal Union Flag).

Canada, Australia, New Zealand and the United Kingdom are also Commonwealth realms which share Charles III as their constitutional monarch and their head of state. The countries share a number of institutional, linguistic and religious similarities such as the use of political systems based upon the Westminster parliamentary system of government, and common law. The CANZUK countries form part of the English-speaking world and share a number of Anglosphere military initiatives with each other including the Fincastle Trophy, Five Eyes intelligence, ABCANZ Armies and AUSCANNZUKUS, which are concerned with increased military and naval co-operation. Canada and the United Kingdom are allied through the North Atlantic Treaty Organization while Australia, New Zealand and the United Kingdom are allied through the Five Power Defence Arrangements. 
 
All four nations have diverse, multicultural populations, free and open presses, and are closely aligned on key social issues. Public relations are extremely warm between the four countries, with consistent evidence that people in Canada, Australia, New Zealand and the United Kingdom regard each other's countries as their country's closest friends and allies in the world.

Since 1983, Australia and New Zealand have had formal trade ties with the Closer Economic Relations (CER) agreement.

In 2021 Australia and the United Kingdom agreed to one of the broadest trade agreements in Australia's history, only comparable with a similar deal between New Zealand and Australia. Greatly liberalising free movement of goods and people, the new agreement will reduce technological and digital barriers between the two nations. It is intended that lawyer degrees in Australia and the United Kingdom will have the same legal framework, making it easier for lawyers in both nations to apply for work in each other's countries. The new agreement will reduce visa requirements for unskilled farmworkers and other regional work sectors.

Country comparison

Economic comparison 
Using data from 2019, below is a table comparing the CANZUK countries to each other, as well as their combined size as a percentage of the world.

Territories and dependencies

Canada 

There are three territories in Canada. Unlike the provinces, the territories of Canada have no inherent sovereignty and have only those powers delegated to them by the federal government. They include all of mainland Canada north of latitude 60° north and west of Hudson Bay and all islands north of the Canadian mainland (from those in James Bay to the Queen Elizabeth Islands). The following table lists the territories in order of precedence (each province has precedence over all the territories, regardless of the date each territory was created).

Australia 

In addition to the six Australian States, Australia also comprises ten territories, whose existence and governmental structure (if any) depend on federal legislation. The territories are distinguished for federal administrative purposes between internal territories, i.e. those within the Australian mainland, and external territories, although the differences among all the territories relate to population rather than location.

Two of the three internal territoriesthe Australian Capital Territory (ACT), which was established to be a neutral site of the federal capital, and the Northern Territoryfunction almost as states. Each has self-government, through its legislative assembly, but the assembly's legislation can be federally overridden. Each has its own judiciary, with appeal to a federal court. The third internal territory, the Jervis Bay Territory, is the product of Australia's complex relationship with its capital city; rather than having the same level of autonomy as the other internal territories, it has services provided by the ACT.

There are also seven external territories, not part of the Australian mainland or of any state. Three of them have a small permanent population, two have tiny and transient populations, and two are uninhabited. All are directly administered by the federal Department of Infrastructure, Regional Development and Cities (or the Department of the Environment and Energy in the case of the Australian Antarctic Territory). Norfolk Island, which is permanently populated, was partially self-governing until 2015.

New Zealand 

The Pacific islands of the Cook Islands and Niue became New Zealand's first colonies in 1901 and then protectorates. From 1965 the Cook Islands became self-governing, as did Niue from 1974. Tokelau came under New Zealand control in 1925 and remains a non-self-governing territory.

The Ross Dependency comprises that sector of the Antarctic continent between 160° east and 150° west longitude, together with the islands lying between those degrees of longitude and south of latitude 60° south. The British(imperial) government took possession of this territory in 1923 and entrusted it to the administration of New Zealand. Neither Russia nor the United States recognises this claim, and the matter remains unresolved (along with all other Antarctic claims) by the Antarctic Treaty, which serves to mostly smooth over these differences. The area is uninhabited, apart from scientific bases.

New Zealand citizenship law treats all parts of the Realm equally, so most people born in New Zealand, the Cook Islands, Niue, Tokelau and the Ross Dependency before 2006 are New Zealand citizens. Further conditions apply for those born from 2006 onwards.

United Kingdom

British Overseas Territories 

The British Overseas Territories (BOTs) are fourteen territories all with a constitutional link with – but not forming part of – the United Kingdom. Most of the permanently inhabited territories are internally self-governing, with the UK retaining responsibility for defence and foreign relations. Three are inhabited only by a transitory population of military or scientific personnel. They all have the British monarch as head of state.

The term "British Overseas Territory" was introduced by the British Overseas Territories Act 2002, replacing the term British Dependent Territory, introduced by the British Nationality Act 1981. Prior to 1 January 1983, the territories were officially referred to as British Crown Colonies.

The British Overseas Territories and Crown Dependencies are themselves distinct from the Commonwealth realms, a group of 15 independent countries (including the United Kingdom) each having Charles III as their reigning monarch, and from the Commonwealth of Nations, a voluntary association of 54 countries mostly with historic links to the British Empire (which also includes all Commonwealth realms).

, three Territories (the Falkland Islands, Gibraltar and the Sovereign Base Areas of Akrotiri and Dhekelia on Cyprus) are the responsibility of the Minister of State for Europe and the Americas; the Minister responsible for the remaining Territories is the Parliamentary Under-Secretary of State for the Overseas Territories and Sustainable Development.

Crown Dependencies 

The Crown Dependencies are three island territories off the coast of Great Britain that are self-governing possessions of The Crown: the Bailiwick of Guernsey, the Bailiwick of Jersey and the Isle of Man. They do not form part of either the United Kingdom or the British Overseas Territories. Internationally, the dependencies are considered "territories for which the United Kingdom is responsible", rather than sovereign states. As a result, they are not member states of the Commonwealth of Nations. However, they do have relationships with the Commonwealth, the European Union, and other international organisations, and are members of the British–Irish Council. They have their own teams in the Commonwealth Games.

As the Crown dependencies are not sovereign states, the power to pass legislation affecting the islands ultimately rests with the government of the United Kingdom (though this is rarely done without the consent of the dependencies, and the right to do so is disputed). However, they each have their own legislative assembly, with the power to legislate on many local matters with the assent of the Crown (Privy Council, or in the case of the Isle of Man in certain circumstances the Lieutenant-Governor). In each case, the head of government is called the Chief Minister.

Including Alderney, Guernsey, and Sark.

Supporting views 

Several organisations have been set up that promote, to varying degrees, much closer associations between the CANZUK nations. CANZUK International has, as its stated aim, the desire to establish an area of freedom of movement akin to that which existed before the European Communities Act 1972, or as a mirror to the rights of free movement as seen within the Trans-Tasman Travel Arrangement. Other organisations are largely voluntary groupings of those who advocate the more specific idea of transnational union, such as "CANZUK Uniting".

Canada

Several members of parliament voiced their support for the CANZUK initiative during the Conservative Party of Canada's 2017 leadership election. The eventual winner of the leadership election, Andrew Scheer, stated his support for a CANZUK free trade deal in March 2017. At a debate in Vancouver, British Columbia, Scheer stated, "I very much support a trade deal with those countries. Australia, New Zealand and the United Kingdom have a similar basis of law, they have a common democratic system, they have the same types of legislation and regulations around investment and trade. Those are the types of things we don't enjoy with China".

Other candidates for the Conservative Party leadership also adopted CANZUK free trade and free movement as a part of their campaigns platforms, including Erin O'Toole and Michael Chong. In April 2017, O'Toole released a video with CANZUK International, describing the CANZUK initiative as "a no brainer", stating that Canada already offers free trade and free mobility with citizens of the United States and should therefore offer such benefits to "our other closest allies". O'Toole again supported CANZUK during his successful campaign for the leadership of the Conservative Party of Canada in 2020.

In August 2018, the Conservative Party of Canada adopted CANZUK as official party policy at their 2018 party convention by 215 votes to 7. The party presently serves as the Official Opposition in the Parliament of Canada.

After his victory in the August 2020 Conservative Party of Canada leadership election, Erin O'Toole, made CANZUK a priority in his platform.

Australia

In August 2017, Liberal Senator for Victoria, James Paterson, published an opinion-piece in the Australian Financial Review declaring support for CANZUK free trade and free movement, stating "With Australia, New Zealand and Canada all lining up to sign post-Brexit trade agreements with the United Kingdom, we have an opportunity to push for a wide-ranging agreement between all four Commonwealth nations...It's an idea whose time has come."

New Zealand

In New Zealand, ACT New Zealand has expressed support for a "free-movement zone", with leader David Seymour stating, "Successful nations like Britain and New Zealand shouldn't be putting up walls and shutting off from each other when it's the exchange of ideas that has made our nations so prosperous. Brexit provides new options as Britain pivots away from European immigration. Let's approach Britain with a proposal for a two-way free movement agreement".

In April 2018 Simon Bridges MP, then Leader of the Opposition and Leader of the National Party, announced his support for CANZUK.

Leader of the New Zealand First political party Winston Peters called in February 2016 for a Commonwealth Free Trade Area modelled on the one in existence between Australia and New Zealand. In his comments, he suggested the inclusion of the UK, Canada, Australia and New Zealand in this area, with the possibility of adding others, referring to the putative free trade area as a 'Closer Commonwealth Economic Relations' area, or CCER. CCER was included as New Zealand government policy in the Labour-NZ First coalition agreement.

United Kingdom

On 11 July 2012, Andrew Rosindell MP for Romford put forward a private members' bill to the UK Parliament which would involve allowing "subjects of Her Majesty's realms to enter the United Kingdom through a dedicated channel at international terminals", "display prominently a portrait of Her Majesty as Head of State" and the Union flag, and other provisions, which would include citizens of Canada, Australia and New Zealand, with the stated aim of introducing reciprocal border agreements between the United Kingdom and other Commonwealth realms in the future. The bill was supported by MPs Nigel Dodds (DUP), Rory Stewart (Conservative), Bob Blackman (Conservative), Steve Baker (Conservative), Priti Patel (Conservative), Mark Menzies (Conservative), Kate Hoey (Labour), Ian Paisley (DUP), John Redwood (Conservative) and Thomas Docherty (Labour). The "Bill failed to complete its passage through Parliament before the end of the session ... and [made] no further progress."

The Adam Smith Institute expressed its support for CANZUK in early 2018.

Then Conservative Party MEP for South East England Daniel Hannan expressed his support for CANZUK as a guest speaker at the 2018 Canadian Conservative Party convention in Halifax. Scottish Conservative MP Bill Grant also expressed his support for increased ties between the United Kingdom, Australia, Canada and New Zealand on his webpage in 2018 and stated that British Ministers are aware of CANZUK and "are very enthusiastic about our future relationships and trade with each of the countries involved".

Since early 2020, the grassroots Conservative Party movement Conservatives for CANZUK has influenced MPs to build support for a post-Brexit realignment of British foreign policy among Conservative Party members, other MPs, peers and policy makers. Open supporters includes 23 MPs among whom notably include Jeremy Hunt and Paul Bristow - chairman of the CANZUK APPG.

Opposing views

Critics have suggested that the CANZUK project would not make sense as a geopolitical construct in the 21st century. Nick Cohen wrote in April 2016 that "It's a Eurosceptic fantasy that the 'Anglosphere' wants Brexit", and emphasises the gradual separation that has occurred between each of the states in both legal and political culture since the end of the British Empire.

Former Australian prime minister Kevin Rudd reiterated this sentiment, stating that "much as any Australian, Canadian and New Zealand governments of whichever persuasion would do whatever they could to frame new free-trade agreements with the UK, the bottom line is that 65 million of us do not come within a bull's roar of Britain's adjacent market of 450 million Europeans", describing the idea as "bollocks".

Economic, geographical, political and social complexities would limit the influence that this bloc could exert. Only one of the countries (the United Kingdom) has significant military capabilities, and it is the only one with a permanent seat on the United Nations Security Council. The UK economy is considerably bigger than those of each of the three other countries.

Chris Randle wrote in Jacobin that "Anglo-conservatives sometimes fantasize about reuniting the dominions under “CANZUK,” a trade bloc where workers could be exploited freely. In Europe's most regionally unequal economy, the United Kingdom, desiccated from years of austerity, this is what passes for political ambition: necromancers sewing each other's zombies together."

Accusations of racism
An editorial in Canada's Globe and Mail, which described CANZUK as "a silly name", pointed out that those Commonwealth countries with which advocates of Brexit were most enamoured were "ex-Dominions where white people predominate" and that even if it were broadened to include populous countries, the group had "nowhere near the latent appetite for trade with Britain that would make the scheme credible". In an article published in The New York Times in April 2018, historian Alex von Tunzelmann stated that "no doubt, the advocates of reviving Britain's links with Canada, Australia and New Zealand can cite myriad reasons that have nothing to do with racism to explain why some other nations are just different. Still, majority-nonwhite nations will notice if they are treated as them rather than us, because this will not be the first time that has happened."

In academia, Duncan Bell criticises contemporary 'Anglospheric discourse' and concludes that modern political commentary is "a pale imitation of previous iterations", lacking support across the political spectrum. International affairs professor Srdjan Vucetic expands on this idea further, describing CANZUK as "the latest variant of a long line of projects seeking to consolidate the British settler empire, projects that were until deep into the second half of the twentieth century justified in explicitly racist terms" and questioned the viability of a CANZUK defence pact without the inclusion of the United States, as in the Five Eyes and ABCANZ alliances.

Official views

On a visit to Australia in September 2019, Liz Truss, then the UK International Trade Secretary, stated that the British government would raise free movement between Australia and the UK during post-Brexit negotiations for a free-trade agreement.

In January 2020, it was reported that Australia's Morrison Government was opposed to expanding freedom of movement between Australia and the UK. Australian trade minister Simon Birmingham had said he "can't imagine full and unfettered free movement" would be discussed during post-Brexit negotiations for a free-trade agreement. Former Australian prime minister Scott Morrison had earlier said in September 2019 that "the New Zealand arrangement is quite unique and it's not one we would probably ever contemplate extending".

Public opinion

Although it has maintained a level of support, the concept of CANZUK is generally regarded as highly polarised between the political left and right. While it has been praised by British nationalists for being an alternative to the European Union, the proposed union has been critiqued by those on the left. Examples of this are by unfavourably comparing CANZUK to the EU, or criticising it as supposedly being racist for solely combining the United Kingdom and three of its five former "white dominions", to the exclusion of other Anglophone countries where people from the United Kingdom formerly settled, such as India, South Africa, Singapore and Nigeria.

2015
Public opinion polling conducted by research firm YouGov in 2015 found that 58 per cent of British people would support freedom of movement and work between the citizens of the United Kingdom and the citizens of Australia, Canada and New Zealand, with 19 per cent opposed to the idea and 23 per cent undecided, with support for the proposals found in all four countries of the United Kingdom. The research also found that British people valued free mobility between the United Kingdom, Australia, Canada and New Zealand more than they valued free mobility between the United Kingdom and the European Union at 46 per cent to 35 per cent. Opinion polls from other firms was not published.

2016
Opinion poll surveys commissioned by the Royal Commonwealth Society in 2016 found that 70 per cent of Australians said they were supportive of the proposal, with 10 per cent opposed to it; 75 per cent of Canadians said they supported the idea and 15 per cent were opposed to it and 82 per cent of New Zealanders stated that they supported the idea, with 10 per cent opposed. All of the respective provinces, states and territories of Australia, Canada and New Zealand registered majority support for the proposals.

2017
Further polling of 2,000 people conducted in January 2017 found support for free movement of people and goods with certain limitations on citizens claiming tax-funded payments on entry across Australia, Canada, New Zealand and the United Kingdom, with undecideds included. Counting undecideds as giving support makes these results somewhat questionable. Support in Australia was at 72 per cent, 77 per cent in Canada, 81 per cent in New Zealand and 64 per cent in the United Kingdom.

2018
A survey carried out by CANZUK International consisting of 13,600 respondents from Australia, Canada, New Zealand and the United Kingdom conducted between January and March 2018 found increased support for reciprocal free trade and movement of people between the countries when compared to 2017, with support at 73 per cent in Australia (up 1 per cent); 76 per cent in Canada (down 1 per cent); 82 per cent in New Zealand (up 1 per cent); and 68 per cent in the United Kingdom (up 4 per cent). The opinion polling indicated greater support for the proposals in the North and South Islands of New Zealand at 83 per cent and 81 per cent support respectively; British Columbia and Ontario in Canada at 82 per cent and 80 per cent support respectively; and New South Wales and Victoria in Australia at 79 per cent support each, while lesser support was observed in Quebec in Canada at 63 per cent support; Northern Ireland, Wales and Scotland in the United Kingdom at 64 per cent, 70 per cent and 66 per cent support respectively; and Western Australia at 65 per cent support.

See also

 ABCANZ Armies
 Air Force Interoperability Council
 Anglosphere
 AUKUS
 AUSCANNZUKUS
 Benelux
 Border Five
 British diaspora
 Commonwealth free trade
 Commonwealth realm
 Five Eyes
 Five Nations Passport Group
 Imperial Federation
 JUSCANZ
 Migration 5
 Pacific Union 
 Regionalism (international relations)
 Supranational union
 The Technical Cooperation Program
 Customs arrangements with the Crown Dependencies

Notes

References 

 
Anglosphere
Australia and the Commonwealth of Nations
Canada and the Commonwealth of Nations
New Zealand and the Commonwealth of Nations
United Kingdom and the Commonwealth of Nations
Australian migration law
Commonwealth of Nations
Commonwealth realms
Freedom of movement
Immigration to Australia
Immigration to Canada
Immigration to New Zealand
Immigration to the United Kingdom
Migration-related organizations
Proposed international organizations
Migration-related organizations based in Canada